Oxenbourne Down, Clanfield is a   Local Nature Reserve north of Clanfield in Hampshire. It is owned and managed by Hampshire County Council. It is part of Butser Hill, which is a Special Area of Conservation and  Site of Special Scientific Interest.

This is part of Queen Elizabeth Country Park. It has unimproved grassland on low fertility soils, which is controlled by grazing. There are also areas of ancient semi-natural woodland.

References

Local Nature Reserves in Hampshire